Alum Creek Lake is a man-made reservoir located in Delaware County, Ohio, United States.

Dam construction (1970–1974) 

Alum Creek Dam was constructed between 1970 and 1974 on Alum Creek, a tributary of Big Walnut Creek, which drains into the Scioto River. The spillway is located high on the right abutment with the raceway dropping off in front of it to the stilling basin below.

Potential dam failure and retrofit (1975–1978) 

On April 24, 1975, during a periodic inspection of the completed dam, the US Army Corps of Engineers expressed concern about the safety of the spillway monoliths. The rock underlying the dam is Ohio Black Shale which is a largely hard, massive silt shale. It is highly fractured below the base of weathering. It may be possible that the spillway monolith and its underlying bedrock could slide forward on one of these seams, opening a gap between the monolith and the rolled earth dam leading to rapid and catastrophic erosion of the dam.

Testing 

Twelve,  diameter core holes were drilled in the raceway directly in front of the ogee weirs. At least six of these cores exhibited a clayey seam about elevation 830 (nine feet below the ogee foundations). Testing of this material and deep-seated sliding analysis indicated that the dam did indeed face a safety issue.

Retrofitting 

To prevent the concrete monolith from sliding forward, it was decided to install seven cable anchors deep into the bedrock. Each anchor consisted of bundled, high strength steel cables that were concreted into the bottom of the holes. They were then hydraulically tensioned and the holes filled with grout. On March 2, 1977, the project was bid to VSL Corporation for $254,777. Drilling for the anchors began on June 7, 1977. The final loading on each anchor was 1300 kips. On September 28, 1977, one of the anchor's foundations failed and had to be re-concreted. By 1978, the project was completed.

January, 2005 Flood 

At this level control was maintained through the discharge pipe and it was not necessary to open the three main spillway gates.

This rain combined with snow melt and saturated ground to produce record breaking runoff. Other reservoirs also set pool level records, including Deer Creek, Delaware Lake, Paint Creek, Atwood Lake, Bolivar Dam, Charles Mill Lake, Dillon Lake, Dover Dam, Mohawk Dam and Wills Creek.

Recreation 
Alum Creek Lake is popular with locals and regional tourists alike with its fishing, picnicking, boating, disc golf course, kitesurfing and hiking opportunities.

References 

 US Army Corps of Engineers Alum Creek Retrofit Case History, 1985
 Barnes, William D., Anchoring of Spillway Monoliths, Alum Creek Lake, Ohio, Concrete Structures Repair and Rehabilitation, Vol C-82-1, September, 1982, US Army Engineer Waterways Experiment Station, Vicksburg, MS.

External links 
Alum Creek Lake current level graph
Alum Creek State Park website
Alum Creek Dam Under Construction Photo #1
Alum Creek Dam Under Construction Photo #2
Ohio DNR fishing map of Alum Creek Lake

Reservoirs in Ohio
Dams in Ohio
Rivers of Delaware County, Ohio
Landforms of Columbus, Ohio
United States Army Corps of Engineers dams
Dams completed in 1974